Akshara Haasan  is an Indian actress who has appeared in Tamil and Hindi-language films. The daughter of actors Kamal Haasan and Sarika Thakur, and the younger sister of Shruti Haasan, she made her film debut with the comedy drama Shamitabh (2015), and later appeared in Kadaram Kondan (2017).

Early life and family

Akshara Haasan was born at 1991 in Madras (present-day Chennai), Tamil Nadu to actors Kamal Haasan and Sarika Thakur. Shruti Haasan is her elder sister. Akshara did her schooling from Abacus Montessori School, Montessori; Lady Andal in Chennai; Beacon High in Mumbai and completed her schooling in Indus International School, Bangalore.

Personal life 
Akshara Haasan lives in Mumbai with her mother. She has converted to Buddhism.  In one of her interview, Akshara turns out, an atheist by belief, she has now converted to Buddhism because she was drawn to it.

Career
Haasan has worked as an assistant director to Rahul Dholakia on the 2010 film Society, starring her mother Sarika, as well as Ram Moorthy, Uzer Khan, E. Niwas and Ruchi Narain on my many AD films in Mumbai. During her stint as an assistant director, she rejected opportunities to feature as an actress, notably turning down an offer to work in Mani Ratnam's Kadal. She also worked for her father's unreleased film, Sabaash Naidu, which had her sister Shruthi Haasan in a supporting role.

Haasan made her debut as an actress in Shamitabh, opposite Dhanush, which also has Amitabh Bachchan in the lead and co-actor of Ajith Kumar in Vivegam in Tamil.

Filmography

Web series

References

External links

 

Kamal Haasan
Living people
Indian film actresses
Actresses in Hindi cinema
Actresses in Tamil cinema
21st-century Indian actresses
Actresses from Chennai
Actresses from Mumbai
Marathi people
Indian Buddhists
Converts to Buddhism
Converts to Buddhism from atheism or agnosticism
1991 births